Lorena Álvarez (born Lorena Álvarez Trejo, January 10, 1973 in Mexico City, Mexico) is a Mexican actress.

Filmography

External links

Lorena Álvarez at the Esmas

1973 births
Living people
Mexican telenovela actresses
Mexican television actresses
Mexican film actresses
Actresses from Mexico City
20th-century Mexican actresses
21st-century Mexican actresses